The 1997 season was the Baltimore Ravens’ second season in the National Football League (NFL) and second under coach Ted Marchibroda. While Baltimore failed to finish above 5th in the AFC Central, they improved from 4–12 in 1996 to 6–9–1.

The Ravens updated their uniforms with a new style of numbers featuring a shadow in the back. White pants were introduced for use with home jerseys, while the black pants continued to be worn on the road.

This was the final NFL season played in Baltimore’s Memorial Stadium.

Offseason

NFL Draft

Undrafted free agents

Staff

Roster

Preseason

Schedule

Regular season

Schedule

Note: Intra-division opponents are in bold text.

Standings

References

Baltimore Ravens
Baltimore Ravens seasons
Baltimore Ravens
1990s in Baltimore